Chang Myung-sam (16 May 1963 – 23 April 2012) was a Korean taekwondo practitioner. He competed in the men's featherweight at the 1988 Summer Olympics. He died in a car accident in 2012.

References

External links
 

1963 births
2012 deaths
Road incident deaths in South Korea
South Korean male taekwondo practitioners
Olympic taekwondo practitioners of South Korea
Taekwondo practitioners at the 1988 Summer Olympics
Kyung Hee University alumni
South Korean expatriates in Japan
South Korean expatriates in the United States
World Taekwondo Championships medalists
Sportspeople from Seoul
20th-century South Korean people